Metazosin is an antihypertensive α1-adrenergic receptor antagonist.

References

Alpha-1 blockers